The Amazon Fire, formerly called the Kindle Fire, is a line of tablet computers developed by Amazon. Built with Quanta Computer, the Kindle Fire was first released in November 2011, featuring a color 7-inch multi-touch display with IPS technology and running on Fire OS, an Android-based operating system. The Kindle Fire HD followed in September 2012, and the Kindle Fire HDX in September 2013. In September 2014, when the fourth generation was introduced, the name "Kindle" was dropped. In later generations, the Fire tablet is also able to convert into a Smart speaker turning on the "Show Mode" options, which the primary interaction will be by voice command through Alexa.

History
The Kindle Fire—which includes access to the Amazon Appstore, streaming movies and TV shows, and the Kindle Store for e-books—was released to consumers in the United States on November 14, 2011, after being announced on September 28.

On September 7, 2012, upgrades to the device were announced with consumer availability to those European countries with a localised version of Amazon's website (United Kingdom, France, Germany, Italy and Spain).

Estimates of the device's initial bill of materials cost ranged from $150 to $202. Amazon's business strategy was stated in 2011 as making money through sales of digital content on the Fire, rather than through sales of the device itself.

, the Kindle Fire was the second best selling tablet after Apple's iPad, with about 7 million units sold according to estimates by Forrester Research and  Amazon's tablets were the fourth best selling.

A more powerful and video-friendly version, the Kindle Fire HD (7 and 8.9 inch versions) was also made available, initially priced at $199 and $299.

The Kindle Fire HDX had an improved graphics engine, double the memory, and triple the processor speed of the previous model.

In September 2014, the Fire HDX 8.9 and the Fire HD were upgraded to the fourth generation of Fire tablets, removing the "Kindle" adjective in the naming scheme.

This fifth generation tablet introduced a micro SD card slot for extra storage.

Fortune reported that, "As with most of Amazon's devices, the aim isn't to make money off of the hardware but instead to sell digital content such as books, movies, and TV shows to users".

A slightly improved Fire 7 was released in June 2017, keeping the US$49.99 price point.

An upgraded model of Fire 7 was announced in May 2019, with a scheduled release in June 2019 and keeping the US$49.99 price point.

Design

Hardware 
The Kindle Fire hardware is manufactured by Quanta Computer (an Original Design Manufacturer), which also originally helped design the BlackBerry PlayBook, using it as a hardware template for the Kindle Fire.
First-generation Kindle Fire devices employed a 1-GHz Texas Instruments OMAP 4430 dual-core processor. Connectivity is through 802.11n Wi-Fi and USB 2.0 (Micro-B connector). The device includes 8 GB of internal storage—said to be enough for 80 applications, plus either 10 movies or 800 songs or 6,000 books. According to Amazon, the first-generation Kindle Fire's 4400 mAh battery sustains up to 8 hours of consecutive reading and up to 7.5 hours of video playback with wireless off; later generations all offered around 7–8 hours

Of the 8 GB internal storage available in the first-generation Kindle Fire, approximately 6.5 GB was available for content.

The first-generation Kindle Fire has a sensor on the upper left-hand corner of the screen. This was widely considered to be an ambient-light sensor, disabled since an early software upgrade.

Colour display technologies consume much more power than monochrome electronic paper (E-ink) types; Fire offer a typical battery life of 8 hours of mixed usage,  while monochrome Kindles offer 15 to 30 hours' use without WiFi—"battery lasts weeks on a single charge"—with a much lower-capacity battery.

Software 
The first generation of Kindle Fire devices run a customised Android 2.3.3 Gingerbread OS. The second-generation Kindle Fire HD runs a customised Android 4.0.3 Ice Cream Sandwich OS. Along with access to Amazon Appstore, the Fire includes a cloud-accelerated "split browser", Amazon Silk, using Amazon EC2 for off-device cloud computation; including webpage layout and rendering, and Google's SPDY protocol for faster webpage content transmission. The user's Amazon digital content is given free storage in Amazon Cloud's web-storage platform, 5 GB music storage in Amazon Cloud Drive, and a built-in email application allows webmail (Gmail, Yahoo!, Hotmail, AOL Mail, etc.) to be merged into one inbox. The subscription-based Amazon Prime, which includes unlimited streaming of movies and TV shows, is available with a free 30-day trial period.

Content formats supported by the first-generation Kindle Fire were Kindle Format 8 (KF8), Kindle Mobi (.azw), TXT, PDF, unrestricted MOBI, PRC natively, Audible (Audible Enhanced (AA, AAX)), DOC, DOCX, JPEG, GIF, PNG, BMP, PSD, EPUB non-DRM AAC, MP3, MIDI, OGG, WAV, MP4, VP8.

Because of Amazon's USB driver implementation, the first-generation Kindle Fire suffered from slow USB transfer speeds. For example, transferring an 800MB video file may have taken more than three minutes in 2011.

It is possible to convert a Kindle Fire to a tablet running standard Android, with some loss of Amazon-related functionality, and lacking features such as Bluetooth, microphone, camera, and memory expansion.

In May 2022, Amazon announced the company were updating the foundation of the Fire Operating System. Amazon’s next Fire 7 Tablet will come with the company’s Fire OS called Fire OS 8, while Fire OS 7 has run on Android 9 since 2018, Fire OS 8 will be based on Android 11, which the company stated is a pretty significant upgrade to the foundational software currently powering Amazon tablets. With this development the company aims to introduce new user features such as a system-wide dark mode.

Reception 
Analysts had projected the device to be a strong competitor to Apple's iPad, and that other Android device makers would suffer lost sales.

In a 2012 review published by Project Gutenberg, the Kindle Fire was called a "huge step back in freedom from the Kindle 3"; the reviewer noted that Amazon introduced a "deliberate limitation" into the Fire that didn't exist in the previous version: it is no longer possible to download free e-books from websites such as Project Gutenberg, Internet Archive and Google Books and have them stored permanently in the same places where books from Amazon are kept.

Sales 
Customers began receiving Kindle Fires on November 15, 2011; in December 2012, customers had purchased over a million Kindle devices per week. International Data Corporation (IDC) estimated that the Kindle Fire sold about 4.7 million units during the fourth quarter of 2011.

The Amazon Kindle Fire helped the company beat their 2012 first quarter estimates and boosted the company's stock in extended trading. As of May 2013, about 7 million units had been sold according to estimates. Statistics for FY2014 or Q1&2 2015 are not yet available.

Family 
Up to the present, there have been eleven generations of Fire tablets, spread across three different feature design lines: Fire, Fire HD and Fire HDX.

Beyond this usage, Fire is used for explicit phone devices and for TV add-on sticks.

Models 
Overview on generations and models for all Fire tablet devices:

Detailed specifications for some of the 7" Fire tablets:

Gallery

See also 
 Fire HD, the 'mid-market' version of the Kindle Fire, with improved specifications, including higher resolution screens and improved processors running Fire OS since 4th generation and Android for the early models.
 Fire HDX, the 'high-end' version of the Kindle Fire, the mostly highly specified Fire, with improved resolution and faster processors running Fire OS for all models.
 Comparison of:
 Tablet computers
 E-book readers

References

External links 

 Fire Tablets – home page on Amazon site
 Amazon Fire - Device and Feature Specifications
 Kindle Fire Review at The Wall Street Journal

Kindle Fire
Android (operating system) devices
Tablet computers
Tablet computers introduced in 2011
Touchscreen portable media players